The First Holder Ministry was the 38th Ministry of the Government of South Australia. It commenced on 21 June 1892, when Frederick Holder succeeded in forming a government after the Second Playford II Ministry lost a confidence vote in parliament. It was succeeded by the Second Downer Ministry on 15 October 1892, after Holder himself lost a confidence vote. Lasting for only 116 days, it was one of the shortest ministries in South Australia.

References

Holder 1